The Alvin Sherman Library, Research, and Information Technology Center, is one of the largest library buildings in the state of Florida. The Alvin Sherman Library is a unique joint-use facility serving the residents of Broward County as well as Nova Southeastern University students, faculty, and staff members. Thanks to an agreement between the Broward County Board of County Commissioners and NSU, the Alvin Sherman Library offers traditional public library services as well as the full academic resources.

This library was opened to the public on December 8, 2001.

The building is five stories high with wireless access throughout the building for NSU patrons, reading niches, 22 study rooms, 1,000 user seats, and a café. It contains research materials, specialized databases, popular fiction and nonfiction books, magazines and journals, CDs, DVDs. A collaborative group study room was opened in late 2015 by the Alvin Sherman Library Circle of Friends. The 2,500 square foot room expansion serves as a platform for students working on group projects, presentations and study groups. Unlike other areas of the library, the collaborative study room was specifically designed to allow students to talk openly. The library hosts special programs for children and teens, book discussion groups, author readings, and classes on using research tools and resources. The library is staffed by professional reference librarians. The Alvin Sherman LRITC building also contains the Rose and Alfred Miniaci Performing Arts Center.

References 

University and college academic libraries in the United States
Public libraries in Florida
Nova Southeastern University
Library buildings completed in 2001
Buildings and structures in Fort Lauderdale, Florida
Education in Fort Lauderdale, Florida
2001 establishments in Florida
Libraries established in 2001